Harold "Hal" N. Kvisle (born Innisfail, Alberta, 1952) is a Canadian businessman in the petroleum industry.

Career 
Kvisle received a bachelor of science in engineering with distinction from the University of Alberta in 1975 and an MBA from the University of Calgary in 1982.

Kvisle joined Dome Petroleum in 1975 and eventually became finance manager. He played a key role in the sale of Dome Petroleum to Amoco Canada in 1987 and 1988. In 1988, he moved to Fletcher Challenge Energy, eventually becoming chief operating officer for South and Central America and president of Canadian operations.

In 1999, Kvisle was recruited by TransCanada PipeLines to be its executive vice-president in trading and business development. In 2001, he was appointed president and chief executive officer. TransCanada Pipelines announced in April 2010 that Kvisle would retire at the end of June 2010; he was replaced by chief operating officer Russ Girling.

Hal was appointed as chief executive officer of Talisman Energy in September 2012, taking over from John Manzoni, until February 2015 when Talisman was bought out by Repsol.

Kvisle is former chairman of the Interstate Natural Gas Association of America and is former chair of the Mount Royal College board of governors. , he is currently a member of the board of directors of the Bank of Montreal, Talisman Energy Inc., Arc Resources and the Nature Conservancy of Canada. He is also a member of the Trilateral Commission.

References

External links 
 Hal Kvisle's page on Bloomberg.com

1952 births
Canadian businesspeople
Living people
University of Alberta alumni
University of Calgary alumni
People from Innisfail, Alberta